Yermolino is a rural locality (a village) in Pereborskoye Rural Settlement, Beryozovsky District, Perm Krai, Russia. The population was 7 as of 2010.

Geography 
Yermolino is located on the Shakva River, 23 km north of  Beryozovka (the district's administrative centre) by road. Bereznik is the nearest rural locality.

References 

Rural localities in Beryozovsky District, Perm Krai